Epicles (Epiklês) was the name of several prominent Ancient Greeks:

 Epicles, an Ancient Greek medical writer who lived after Bacchius, and therefore probably in the 2nd or 1st century BC. Epicles is quoted by Erotianus, who wrote a commentary on the obsolete words found in the writings of Hippocrates, which he arranged in alphabetical order.
 Epicles of Troy, a Lycian or Trojan prince killed by Ajax.
 Epicles of Hermione, a musician who played the lyre, mentioned by Plutarch.
 Epicles, the eponymous archon of Athens of 131–130 BC
 Epicles, the father of Proteas, an Athenian admiral in the Peloponnesian War, mentioned by Thucydides.
 Epicles of Thespiae, mentioned on a dedication at Delphi.
 Epicleas, a Spartan admiral during the Peloponnesian War.

References
 

Year of birth unknown
2nd-century BC Greek physicians
Ancient Greek writers